Vadi is a village in the Ponda taluka (sub-district) of Goa.

Area, population

According to the official 2011 Census, Vadi in Ponda taluka has an area of 161.01 hectares, a total of 110 households, a population of 506 (comprising 246 males and 260 females) with an under-six years population of 49 (comprising 27 boys and 22 girls).  Its village code under the Indian census is 626,858.

Location

It lies approximately 5.7 km from the sub-district (taluka) headquarters of Ponda town via the Ponda-Durbhat road, and approximately 35.4 km away from the district North Goa headquarters of Panaji or Panjim.

Local jurisdiction

Vadi (or Wadi) falls under the Talaulim Grama panchayat or village council.

References

Villages in South Goa district